Salley can refer to:

People
 John Salley, basketball player
 Nate Salley, American football player
 Jonas Salley, football (soccer) player

Places
 Salley, South Carolina

See also
 Sally (disambiguation)